The 2015 Women's African Nations Championship was the 17th edition of the Women's African Volleyball Championship organised by Africa's governing volleyball body, the Confédération Africaine de Volleyball. It was held in Nairobi, Kenya, from 12 to 20 June 2015. The top two team qualified for the 2015 FIVB Volleyball Women's World Cup.

Kenya won the championship defeating Algeria in the final and Cameroon won the bronze medal over Senegal.

Competing nations
The following national teams have confirmed participation:

Squads

Venue

Format
The tournament is played in two stages. In the first stage, the participants are divided in two groups. A single round-robin format is played within each group to determine the teams' group position (as per procedure below).

In the second stage, the two best teams of each group progress to the semifinals, while the third and fourth placed teams from each group progress to the classification matches (for 5th to 8th place). The second stage of the tournament consists of a single-elimination.

Pool standing procedure
 Number of matches won
 Match points
 Sets ratio
 Points ratio
 Result of the last match between the tied teams

Match won 3–0 or 3–1: 3 match points for the winner, 0 match points for the loser
Match won 3–2: 2 match points for the winner, 1 match point for the loser

Pool composition
The drawing of lots was held in Nairobi, Kenya on 12 June.

Preliminary round

 All times are East Africa Time (UTC+03:00).

Pool A

|}

|}

Pool B

|}

|}

Final round
 All times are East Africa Time (UTC+03:00).

5th–8th place

Classification 5th–8th places

|}

Seventh place match

|}

Fifth place match

|}

Championship

Semifinals

|}

Bronze medal match

|}

Final

|}

Final standing

Source: CAVB.

Awards

MVP
 Everlyne Makuto
Best Setter
 Jane Wairimu
Best Receiver
 Laetitia Moma Bassoko
Best Libero
 Elizabeth Wanyama

Best Attacker
 Fatou Diuock
Best Blocker
 Ruth Jepngetich
Best Server
 Lydia Oulmou

Source: CAVB.

See also
2015 Men's African Volleyball Championship

References

External links

2015 Women
African Women's Volleyball Championship
African Women's Volleyball Championship
Women's African Volleyball Championship
International volleyball competitions hosted by Kenya
Women's African Volleyball Championship